Colin Kelly (born December 29, 1989) is a professional gridiron football offensive tackle for the Seattle Sea Dragons of the XFL. He played college football at Oregon State. He was signed by the Kansas City Chiefs as an undrafted free agent in 2013. He has also been a member of the San Francisco 49ers, Chicago Bears and Jacksonville Jaguars in the NFL, and the Ottawa Redblacks and Edmonton Elks in the CFL.

College career
Kelly attended Oregon State University and played for the Oregon State Beavers football program beginning in 2008. After redshirting his freshman year in 2008, Kelly played in 12 games for Oregon State, with the majority of his playing time coming on special teams. In 2010, Kelly played in 11 games on special teams and as a back-up tackle. Between his junior and senior seasons from 2011 to 2012, Kelly started 25 straight games at right tackle for the Beavers.

Professional career

Kansas City Chiefs
Kelly signed with the Kansas City Chiefs as an undrafted free agent following the 2013 NFL Draft. Kelly spent the entire 2013 NFL season on the Chiefs injured reserve list following a knee injury he suffered in July 2013. On June 3, 2014, the Chiefs released Kelly.

Ottawa Redblacks
On June 27, 2014, the Ottawa Redblacks (CFL) signed Kelly as a free agent. In 2014, Kelly started in eight games for the Redblacks, in a season in which they went on to finish with a record of 2–16. The following season, Kelly started in all 18 regular season games, as well as in the East division final against the Hamilton Tiger-Cats and the 103rd Grey Cup, which Ottawa lost, 26–20 to the Edmonton Eskimos.

San Francisco 49ers
On January 20, 2016, the San Francisco 49ers officially signed Kelly to a future/reserve contract. The 49ers struck a deal with Kelly for a two-year contract, with $65,000 of his first year salary guaranteed. During OTAs, Kelly saw action with the second string offensive line group. On September 3, in an attempt to trim their roster down to the 53-man limit, San Francisco released Kelly and 20 other members of the roster.

Chicago Bears
On September 26, 2016, the Chicago Bears signed Kelly to their practice squad. On November 9, Kelly was released from the Bears' practice squad.

San Francisco 49ers (II)
On November 15, 2016, Kelly was signed to the 49ers' practice squad.

Jacksonville Jaguars
On January 11, 2017, Kelly signed a reserve/future contract with the Jacksonville Jaguars. On May 1, 2017, Kelly was released by the Jaguars.

Edmonton Eskimos / Elks
On May 9, 2017, Kelly signed with the Edmonton Eskimos. He signed a contract extension through the 2022 season on January 11, 2021.

Hamilton Tiger-Cats
On June 26, 2022, Kelly was traded to the Hamilton Tiger-Cats in exchange for a seventh-round pick in the 2023 CFL Draft.

Seattle Sea Dragons
Kelly signed with the Seattle Sea Dragons of the XFL on February 14, 2023.

References

External links
CFL bio
Oregon State bio
San Francisco 49ers bio
Chicago Bears bio

1989 births
Living people
People from Longview, Washington
American football offensive tackles
Oregon State Beavers football players
Kansas City Chiefs players
Ottawa Redblacks players
San Francisco 49ers players
Chicago Bears players
Jacksonville Jaguars players
Players of American football from Washington (state)
Edmonton Elks players
Hamilton Tiger-Cats players
Canadian football offensive linemen
American players of Canadian football
Seattle Sea Dragons players